Yariv is a Jewish given name and surname. Notable people with the name include:

Given name
Yariv Levin (born 1969), Israeli lawyer and politician
Yariv Mozer, (1978), Israeli film producer, screenwriter and film director
Yariv Oppenheimer, far-left Israeli activist and politician

Surname
Aharon Yariv (1920–1994), Israeli politician and general
Amnon Yariv (born 1930), Israeli-American scientist
Joseph Yariv  (1927–2021), Israeli biochemist, the namesake of Yariv reagent
Leeat Yariv, American professor in economics

See also

Jewish surnames
Hebrew-language surnames